Marcel Bouzout Stefano (born March 2, 1971) is a retired male professional basketball player from Uruguay.

Professional career
Bouzout was the Uruguayan League MVP, and Uruguayan League Finals MVP, in 2006.

National team career
Bouzout played with the senior Uruguayan national basketball team in the 1990s, and the early 2000s (decade). He won two continental titles with the men's national squad (1995 and 1997) during his career.

References
  urubasket

1971 births
Living people
Uruguayan men's basketball players
Basketball players at the 1995 Pan American Games
Basketball players at the 1999 Pan American Games
Pan American Games competitors for Uruguay
Uruguayan people of French descent